Behnamvasat-e Jonubi Rural District is in Javadabad District of Varamin County, Tehran province, Iran. At the National Census of 2006, its population was 6,152 in 1,514 households. There were 5,983 inhabitants in 1,601 households at the following census of 2011. At the most recent census of 2016, the population of the rural district was 6,655 in 1,943 households. The largest of its 31 villages was Ab Barik, with 2,034 people.

References 

Varamin County

Rural Districts of Tehran Province

Populated places in Tehran Province

Populated places in Varamin County